Jean-Philippe may refer to:

Jean-Philippe (film)
Jean-Philippe (given name)

See also
Jean Philippe, French singer